A hafir is an artificially constructed water catchment basin with a circular earthen wall and diameters of between 70-250 m and heights of up to 7 m. Adapted to semi-desert conditions, the hafirs catch the water during the rainy season to have it available for several months during the dry season to supply drinking water, irrigate fields and water cattle. It is used in central Sudan from time immemorial.

History
Hafirs were an important feature of the Meroitic civilization in the Butana and were often built in the immediate vicinity of temples, for example the Great Hafir near the Lion Temple in Musawwarat es-Sufra. 800 ancient and modern hafirs have been registered in the Butana. Some scholars assume that the hafirs near temples were a Meroitic policy to control pastoralists’ movements and collect taxes.

This irrigation technique was improved at the time of the Turkish-Egyptian rule in present Sudan. At the end of the 1940s, the British colonial government used an irrigation program to allow the mechanised cultivation of sorghum.

Present-day
Hafirs are still constructed and used today in central Sudan. Today's hafirs hold between 10,000 m3 and 60,000 m3 of water mostly administered by village communities and are used for irrigation. Only the hafirs excavated by the government are also accessible to the herds of nomads.

Notes 

Water supply infrastructure
Vernacular architecture
Geography of Sudan